WGFC is a Southern Gospel-formatted broadcast radio station licensed to Floyd, Virginia, serving Floyd and Floyd County, Virginia. WGFC is owned and operated by New Life Christian Communications, Inc.

References

External links
 Gospel Voice 1030 WGFC Online

1985 establishments in Virginia
Southern Gospel radio stations in the United States
Radio stations established in 1985
GFC
GFC